The Artois Hound is a rare breed of dog, and a descendant of the Bloodhound. A scent hound 22–23 inches high at the withers, weighing anything between 55 and 65 pounds, it is a well constructed dog with a slow graceful gait. It has a large, strong head, a medium-length back and a pointed tail that tends to be long and sickle-shaped. Their ears are set at eye level; they have large prominent eyes and quite thick lips.

Characteristics

Appearance
A well constructed dog, muscled and not too long, giving the impression of strength and energy.

Head

 Cranial Region: Its skull should be strong, broad, quite short, rounded and flat at its upper part but with the occipital protuberance only slightly pronounced. Its stop should be accentuated.
Facial Region: Its nose should be black, strong, with wide opened nostrils. Its muzzle should be straight and, seen in profile, moderately elongated. Of its lips, the upper lip should largely be covering the lower lip and must be rather important so as to give a square shape to the extremity of the muzzle, (as seen in profile). Its jaws/teeth should have a scissor bite, the upper incisors covering the lower in a narrow contact and are well set squarely in relation to the jaws. Its eyes, in relation to the width of the forehead, should not be very close together; they should be round, level with the head surface, with a melancholic and soft expression; they are dark brown in colour.  The mucous membranes of the lower lids must not be visible. Its leathers should be set at eye level, a little thick, broad, round at the tip, almost flat and quite long, reaching the beginning of the nose. Its neck is moderately long, powerful; very little dewlap.

Body
Its back is broad and well supported. Its loins are slightly arched. The hips give a slight inclination to its croup, which is well muscled. Its chest is broad and long, rather let down so that the sternal line arrives at elbow level. Its  ribs should be well sprung. Its belly flanks fully its body.

Tail
It is strong and quite long; there should be some longer and coarser, slightly offstanding hairs, (like ears of grain) towards the tip. It is carried in a sickle fashion, never falling forward.

Limbs

Forequarters
A view of the ensemble indicates that its limbs are strong and vertical. Its shoulders are oblique and muscled. Its elbows are set well in the axis of the body. Its forearm should be lightly oblique.

Hindquarters
A view of the ensemble indicates that, (seen from behind), the point of the buttock, the middle of the leg, the hock, the metatarsal and the foot are on the same vertical line. Its upper thighs are let down and well muscled. Its hock joints are strong and moderately angulated, and the metatarsals are short and strong.

Feet
They are slightly elongated, strong but sufficiently tight; the pads are black, tough and compact.

Coat and colour
Its skin is quite thick. Its hair is short, thick and quite flat. The coat pattern is a dark fawn tri-colour, (similar to the coat of a hare or a badger), with a mantle or in large patches. The head is usually fawn, sometimes with a black overlay. Its main colours being tan and black and white in any combination.

Temperament
The Artois Hound is an energetic dog that is brave and loyal. Though it has a large amount of endurance, it is calm and well balanced. It is a moderate sized dog that will feature the best characteristics of the scenthounds. It has a powerful sense of smell, and it is fast and independent. These dogs were bred to hunt rabbits, and they are proficient at this task. These dogs need to be trained by owners who are consistent. They are affectionate and loving to those that care for them. Like all scent hounds they are happiest when on the trail of a good scent.

Hunting
The Artois Hound, (a Briquet, (of a small type)), is nowadays used especially in hunting with guns, and on horseback.  It drives the game closer taking advantage of their faults with ingenuity; its speed is average but maintained.

In general countryside : Because of its acute sense of smell, it is capable of outmanoeuvring many of its prey's tactics.
In woodland areas : With its ancestral qualities of a hunter, in sparse and well scattered groups of tall trees, it can hunt a deer efficiently, and in the desired direction of its owner.
In the thicket : its intrepidity and bravery means that it can stir up and even the most obstinate boars.

History

Le Couteulx de Canteleu, in Manuel de Vénerie Française (1890), (Manual of French Hunting - 1890), reports that the artesian breed of his time was crossbred and difficult to find pure but, despite that, it remained one of the best breeds for hare hunting. Northern France, bordering the English Channel, consists of the historical regions of Artois Hound. Hounds from this region stem from some of the earliest types.

During the 19th century, the Artois Hound was increasingly crossbred with British breeds. Towards the end of this century and at the beginning of the 20th, M. Levoir in Picardy had attempted the re-establishment of the old Artois type without really succeeding. During that period and until the beginning of the First World War, it was another Picard breeder, Mr. Mallard, who dominated the raising of the breed. But if he produced very pretty dogs, as witnessed by his numerous awards in canine shows, they were not always in the type conformed with the description given by contemporary authors. For all their efforts however the Second World War was very damaging for the breed and after the Second World War, it was believed that the Artois was all but extinct.

By the middle of the 20th century the breed had nearly disappeared, however in the 1970s a few aficionados, in particular Mr. Audrechy, (of Buigny les Gamaches in the Somme), decided to reconstitute the breed from a few remaining specimens which they located after a long search. Thanks to their efforts the modern day Artois hound closely resembles the original.

Notes
The Artois Hound is recognized by the FCI and the United Kennel Club.

See also
 Dogs portal
 List of dog breeds
Beagle
Anglo-Français de Petite Vénerie

References

Other sources

External links

FCI breeds
Scent hounds
Dog breeds originating in France